The Shire of Orbost was a local government area about  east of Melbourne, the state capital of Victoria, Australia.

History

Originally, Orbost was part of the Bairnsdale Road District, which was created on 30 April 1867. Splitting away as part of the Shire of Tambo in 1882, Orbost was first incorporated as a shire in its own right, as the Shire of Croajingolong, on 30 May 1892. It was renamed as the Shire of Orbost on 17 February 1893. On 3 January 1913, part of its western riding was annexed to Tambo as its Cunninghame Riding.

On 2 December 1994, the Shire of Orbost was abolished, and along with the City of Bairnsdale, the Shires of Bairnsdale and Tambo, and parts of the Shire of Omeo and the Boole Boole Peninsula from the Shire of Rosedale, was merged into the newly created Shire of East Gippsland.

Wards

Orbost was divided into four ridings on 31 May 1895, each of which elected three councillors:
 North Riding
 South Riding
 East Riding
 Central Riding

Towns and localities
 Bellbird Creek
 Bendoc
 Bonang
 Cann River
 Club Terrace
 Genoa
 Mallacoota
 Marlo
 Newmerella
 Orbost*

* Council seat.

Population

* Estimate in the 1958 Victorian Year Book.

References

External links
 Victorian Places - Orbost Shire

Orbost